James Robert Alexander Chinnery-Haldane (14 August 1840 – 16 February 1906) was an Anglican bishop in the last decades of the 19th century and the first decade of the 20th century.

Early life
He was born in Hatcham, Surrey, the son of the barrister and newspaper proprietor Alexander Haldane (son of Scottish cleric James Haldane) and Emma Hardcastle. His early education was at Bury St Edmunds Grammar School, Suffolk. He entered Trinity College, Cambridge on 26 August 1861 and graduated with a Bachelor of Laws (1865); later graduating with a Master of Laws (1885) and Doctor of Divinity (1889). He was admitted to the Inner Temple on 5 May 1864. He assumed the additional surname of Chinnery on 29 July 1864, just before his marriage on 23 August 1864 to Anna Elizabeth Chinnery (died 30 November 1907), only daughter of the Reverend Sir Nicholas Chinnery, Baronet of Flintfield, County Cork.

Anglican ministry
He was ordained a deacon in 1866 and began his Anglican ministry as a curate at Calne, Wiltshire (1866–1869), during which time he was ordained a priest in 1867. He moved to Scotland where served as a curate at All Saints, Edinburgh (1869–1876). His next pastoral appointment was a curate at Ballachulish, with charge of Nether Lochaber (1876–1879). Afterwards, becoming the incumbent at Ballachulish (with Glencoe) (1879–1885), and Incumbent at Nether Lochaber (1879–1895). He also became Dean of the Diocese of Argyll and The Isles (1881–1883).

He was consecrated the Bishop of Argyll and The Isles at Fort William on 24 August 1883 by Robert Eden, Primus of the Scottish Episcopal Church, with bishops Cotterill, Wilson, Jermyn, Lightfoot, and Kelly as co-consecrators. He also served as Provost of Cumbrae (1886–1891).

Chinnery-Haldane died in office at Alltshellach House Nether Lochaber on 16 February 1906, aged 63.

References

Bibliography

 

1842 births
1906 deaths
Alumni of Trinity College, Cambridge
19th-century Scottish Episcopalian bishops
Alexander
Provosts of the Cathedral of The Isles
Deans of Argyll and The Isles
Bishops of Argyll and The Isles
People from Surrey (before 1889)
20th-century Scottish Episcopalian bishops